India–Myanmar–Thailand Trilateral Highway (IMT Highway),  long route, is a highway under upgrade under India's Look East policy that will connect Moreh, India with Mae Sot, Thailand via Myanmar.

The road is expected to boost trade and commerce in the ASEAN–India Free Trade Area, as well as with the rest of Southeast Asia. India has also proposed extending the highway to Cambodia, Laos and Vietnam. The proposed approx  route from India to Vietnam is known as the East-West Economic Corridor (Thailand to Cambodia and Vietnam became operational in 2015). This highway will also connect to the river ports being developed along the way at Kalay (also called Kalaymyo) and Monywa on Chindwin River.

India and ASEAN have plans to extend this route to Laos, Cambodia and Vietnam as this connectivity will generate annually, an estimated US$70 billion in incremental GDP and 20 million in incremental aggregate employment by 2025, and India has offered US$1 billion line-of-credit for the India-ASEAN connectivity projects (c. Dec 2017).

In December 2020, Bangladesh expressed official interest to join the highway project in order to boost connectivity from Dhaka. The existing BBIN motor vehicle agreement facilitates reduced border controls and customs inspection for freight transport between India and Bangladesh.

History

A highway connecting Moreh to Mae Sot via Myanmar was first proposed at a trilateral ministerial meeting on transport linkages in Yangon in April 2002. The following sections needed upgrade, all other sections were already operational in good condition as the national highways.

Moreh-Tamu-Kalemyo-Kalewa section

This road was built by the Border Roads Organisation (BRO), a wing of the Indian Army. The BRO maintained the road until 2009, when it was transferred to the Government of Myanmar. Per the original agreement between India and Myanmar on the Friendship Road project, the Indian government was tasked with widening and repaving the existing roads in the area, while the Myanmar government would upgrade the decrepit single-lane bridges along the route. However, the Myanmar government failed to carry out the upgradation work. In May 2012, India announced that it would invest US$100 million to repave the existing highway and upgrade all 71 bridges that Myanmar had failed to build. Myanmar stated that it would upgrade the Yargi-Monywa section and open the existing motorway between Mandalay-Naw Pyi Taw and Yangon. Following the 2015 Myanmar elections, the new government withdrew the country's commitment, and India was expected to upgrade the stretch from Moreh to Monywa. An alternate alignment for the stretch between Mandalay-Naw Pyi Taw and Yangon was also proposed.

The Indian government also plans to construct a road from Zokhawthar, Mizoram through the Zokhawthar-Rih border to Tedim in the Chin State of Myanmar. This will serve as an additional point of crossing from India to the trilateral highway in Myanmar.

Kalewa-Yagyi section

During Myanmar President U. Htin Kyaw's state visit to India in August 2016, an MoU was signed with the Government of India under which the latter will fund the construction of 69 bridges, including approach roads in the Tamu-Kyigone-Kalewa section of the highway, and also upgrade the Kalewa-Yagyi section. India provided funding for the renovation of 73 bridges along the route in Myanmar that were originally built during World War II. India and Myanmar signed an agreement to speed up construction of the highway on 29 August 2016. Prabir De, coordinator of the ASEAN-India Centre at the Research and Information System for Developing Countries, stated in November 2017 that the Border Roads Organisation had completed upgrading the  Tamu-Kalewa-Kalemyo section of the highway in Myanmar at a cost of US$27.28 million. In August 2017, the government of India allocated US$256 million for the upgrade of  highway from Moreh in Manipur through Tamu, Myanmar to Mae Sot in Thailand. On 6 September 2017, the National Highway Authority of India awarded a  construction and maintenance road contract for the Kalewa-Yagyi section in Myanmar to a joint venture of Punj Lloyd and Varaha Infra Ltd. The  stretch will be upgraded to a two-lane road. The engineering, procurement and construction contract for the project will entirely be funded by the Indian Foreign Ministry. On 11 April 2018, Yagyi-Kalewa section was finally awarded to Punj Lloyd, to be completed in 3 years by April 2021 for Rs.1,177 crore in Engineering, procurement, and construction (EPC) mode under a special purpose vehicle, which will be an international standard highway with two-lane in each direction with paved shoulders, entailing 6 truck stops, 20 bus stops and passenger shelters, 1 rest area, strengthening of 4 existing major bridges and 9 existing minor bridges, and construction of 3 new major bridges and 2 new minor bridges.

Myawaddy-Thinggan Nyenaung-Kawkareik section 

Construction on the section had begun in 2012. On the same day, a foundation stone laying ceremony was held at Myawaddy, Myanmar to mark the beginning of construction of the Myanmar-Thailand Friendship Bridge No.2 that will link Mae Sot, Thailand with Myawaddy.

Ein Du-Thaton section

In February 2017, Myanmar approved a proposal from the Thai government permitting the latter to upgrade a  section of the road between Thaton in Mon State and Ein Du in Kayin State. The upgrade will be financed by Thailand at a cost of US$51 million. Under the project, the road will be widened and its surface improved. Myanmar also requested Thailand to assist in the development of other sections of the highway.

Financing

In May 2017, India's NITI Aayog proposed establishing a Special Purpose Vehicle owned by all three countries to monitor and implement the project.

Travel arrangements

Moreh-Tamu border crossing

Moreh ICP in India is already operational.  Tamu is the border town on Myanmar side.

Vehicle trial run 

A trial run of passenger vehicles on the highway up to Naypyidaw, the capital of Myanmar, was carried out during November 9–14, 2015 in which Indian vehicles travelled to Myanmar on the Imphal-Mandalay-Bagan-Naypyidaw route and back, with Myanmar vehicles joining the Indian vehicles on the return journey. In order to let people know about the highway, a car rally was flagged off by the governments of the three countries from New Delhi. The rally will travel from New Delhi to Guwahati and will enter Myanmar from Manipur (India) before moving on to Bangkok.

Motor Vehicle Agreement and visa arrangements

In 2015, India proposed a trilateral Motor Vehicle Agreement to facilitate seamless movement of passenger and cargo vehicles among the three countries. In May 2017, during a visit by Thai officials to Manipur, the state's Chief Secretary Oinam Nabakishore declared that the draft of the trilateral agreement had already been prepared. In December 2017, Myanmar stated that it needed time to review all of its connectivity agreements, before proceeding with this agreement.

In early 2018, visa agreement were signed for the citizens of two nations to travel by road for education, medical assistance, tourism and other purposes.

As of May 2018, the signing of Motor vehicle agreement is still pending.

Bus service

In September 2017, Indian ambassador to Myanmar announced that an Imphal-Mandalay India-Myanmar bus service will commence from 2018 after India and Myanmar sign the motor vehicle agreement.

As of May 2018, this is still pending subject to the signing of Motor vehicle agreement by the Myanmar.

Rail connectivity

India initiated a preliminary survey to determine the feasibility of establishing a rail link parallel to the trilateral highway in January 2018. Japan expressed interest in collaborating with India and funding the proposed rail link.

Route upgrade status

The status of upgrade of various segments of the highway according to India's Ministry of Development of the Northeast Region is shown below. During 9–14 December 2015, there was an Imphal-Mandalay-Naypyidaw bus service trial run on the  bumpy stretch between Kalewa-Yagyi.

Additional inter-connectivity

Connectivity to Bangladesh 

In November 2020, BIMSTEC partner Bangladesh expressed interest in joining this Highway through Tripura.
India plans to upgrade route from Zokhawthar in Mizoram to Tedim in Chin State of Myanmar as an additional connect to the IMT trilateral highway.

Look-East connectivity

Commerce with South and East Asian nations accounts for almost 45% of India's foreign trade. Myanmar and ASEAN nations are part of India's Look East policy. India is part of BIMSTEC, East Asia Summit, Mekong-Ganga Cooperation, United Nations Economic and Social Commission for Asia and the Pacific, Asian Highway Network and the Trans-Asian Railway network and India has embarked on several Look-East connectivity projects.

See also 
 Borders of India
 Dawei Port Project
 Kaladan Multi-Modal Transit Transport Project
 India–Myanmar barrier
 Look-East Connectivity projects
 Pakokku Bridge

References 

Roads in India
Roads in Myanmar
Roads in Thailand
India–Myanmar relations
India–Thailand relations
Myanmar–Thailand relations